Budoart (a portmanteau of boudoir and art) is a contemporary art gallery specializing in contemporary Czech artists, based in Prague.

It is located in the Vinohrady district, in an apartment, hence the name boudoir underlining the intimate proportions of the exhibitions.

Amongst artists exhibited in Budoart are mostly young artists, Nikola Brabcová, Alžběta Josefy, Pavla Gajdošíková, Christophe Gilland, Patricie Fexová, Pavel Hayek, Václav Kočí, Martin Krajc, Kamila Najbrtová, Šárka Růžičková, Zbyněk Sedlecký, Robert Šalanda, Zdeněk Trs, Barbora Vobořilová or Jana Vojnárová or Jiří Votruba.

It was deemed one of the ten best art galleries in Prague by Design Guide, the magazine of Designblok and recommended by Expats.cz.

References

External links 
Budoart

Contemporary art galleries in Europe
Companies based in Prague
Culture in Prague